are a Japanese musical ensemble established by Nippon Columbia and Toei Company to perform on the soundtracks for the Super Sentai Series beginning with Engine Sentai Go-onger.

For the various series, Columbia has taken various popular vocalists of anime songs and brought them together in a group called Project.R (the "R" stands for "Ranger"). The opening and ending themes and the insert songs are performed by individual members or a subset of members of Project.R. Several songs are performed by long standing theme song singers who are not included as being members of Project.R (the songs are composed by Project.R members, though). These artists are Shinichi Ishihara, MoJo, Akira Kushida, Takayuki Miyauchi, Koji Onoda, Ichirou Mizuki, and Make-Up.

Members

Performing members

Takahashi made his debut as a member of Project.R singing the Engine Sentai Go-onger and Tokumei Sentai Go-Busters opening themes.

Tanimoto was the vocalist of the Juken Sentai Gekiranger opening theme and Ressha Sentai ToQger ending theme.
Sister MAYO
Sister MAYO was the vocalist of the Mahou Sentai Magiranger and Kishiryu Sentai Ryusoulger ending theme.
NoB
NoB is a member and vocalist of 1980s rock band Make-Up, and made his solo debut as the vocalist of the GoGo Sentai Boukenger and Tensou Sentai Goseiger opening themes.

Iwasaki composed the Bakuryū Sentai Abaranger opening theme before debuting as the vocalist of the Mahou Sentai Magiranger opening theme.

Takatori was the vocalist of the Ninpuu Sentai Hurricaneger  and Doubutsu Sentai Zyuohger opening themes, as well as the Samurai Sentai Shinkenger and Zyuden Sentai Kyoryuger ending themes.

Gojo performed songs for the Pretty Cure series before performing vocals on the Magiranger image song .

Composed of vocalist YOFFY and guitarist IMAJO, Psychic Lover performed the Tokusou Sentai Dekaranger and Samurai Sentai Shinkenger opening themes.

Matsubara is a former member of Ultra Series vocal group Project DMM and was vocalist for the Samurai Sentai Shinkenger image song  before performing the Kaizoku Sentai Gokaiger opening theme and Uchu Sentai Kyuranger ending theme.

Oshitani previously performed the B-side "Over the Star" on the Dragon Ball Z Kai single "Yeah! Break! Care! Break!" before performing as one of the many vocalists on the Gokaiger ending theme.

Kamada was the vocalist of the Zyuden Sentai Kyoryuger opening theme and Ressha Sentai ToQger ending theme.

Onishi was the vocalist of the Shuriken Sentai Ninninger opening theme and Doubutsu Sentai Zyuohger ending theme.

Zetki is a Japanese jazz band fronted by Hideaki Takatori on vocals and includes Hiroaki Kagoshima on piano. They had performed the backtrack on the Samurai Sentai Shinkenger ending theme.

 Non-performing members 

The leader of Project.R, Ohishi had been an arranger for Psychic Lover and made his composing and arranging debuts on the Go-onger ending themes.

Kagoshima arranged the Hurricaneger ending theme before arranging the Shinkenger and Gokaiger ending themes.

Miyaba was a composer on the Chojin Sentai Jetman and Abaranger soundtracks and a mixer on the Denji Sentai Megaranger soundtracks.

Sugiyama wrote several songs in Doraemon and Macross Frontier before writing the Go-onger themes.

Ohashi composed and arranged the Abaranger soundtracks as a member of Kentarō Haneda with Healthy Wings.

Takaki composed and arranged the Abaranger soundtracks as a member of Kentarō Haneda with Healthy Wings.

Miyaki had written and arranged various insert songs in Gekisou Sentai Carranger and also composed and arranged the Hurricaneger and Gekiranger soundtracks; he arranged the Gekiranger ending theme.

Yamashita was a composer and arranger on the Abaranger soundtracks as a member of Kentarō Haneda with Healthy Wings and made his composing and arranging debuts on the Magiranger soundtracks.

Kameyama was a composer and arranger of various insert songs in Carranger, Megaranger and Seiju Sentai Gingaman before composing and arranging the Mirai Sentai Timeranger and Dekaranger soundtracks.

Suzuki wrote an insert song on the Go-onger soundtracks.

Non-members

MoJo

Nippon Columbia enka singer

MAKE-UP
NoB's band

Debut performance on Goseiger soundtracks

Starmen is a band consisting of seven voice actors

Initial success
The single of the opening and ending themes of Engine Sentai Go-onger reached #4 on the Oricon Weekly Rankings Charts in its first week, selling 22,000 records. It is the first theme song single for any Super Sentai series to reach the Oricon's top ten list, reaching #3 on its first day of sale, March 19, 2008, and remaining in the top 20 for four weeks.

Discography
Engine Sentai Go-onger
 - March 19, 2008
 - April 30, 2008
 - July 2, 2008
"Korochan Pack: Engine Sentai Go-onger 2" - July 2, 2008

"Korochan Pack: Engine Sentai Go-onger 3 - September 3, 2008
 - January 14, 2009

Samurai Sentai Shinkenger
 - March 18, 2009
 - April 29, 2009
"Korochan Pack Samurai Sentai Shinkenger 2" - July 15, 2009
 - July 29, 2009
"Korochan Pack Samurai Sentai Shinkenger 3" - August 19, 2009
 - February 10, 2010

Tensou Sentai Goseiger
 - March 17, 2010
 - April 21, 2010
/ - April 28, 2010
"Korochan Pack Tensou Sentai Goseiger #2"/Tensou Sentai Goseiger Mini Album #2 - June 23, 2010Tensou Sentai Goseiger  - July 21, 2010
"Korochan Pack Tensou Sentai Goseiger" #3/Tensou Sentai Goseiger Mini Album #3 - August 18, 2010 - December 29, 2010

Super Sentai Versus Series Theater
 - May 23, 2010
Lyrics: Saburo Yatsude
Composition & Arrangement: Hiroshi Takaki
Artist: Project.R (Hideaki Takatori, YOFFY, Takayoshi Tanimoto)

Kaizoku Sentai Gokaiger
 - March 2, 2011
/ - March 2, 2011
Mini Album Kaizoku Sentai Gokaiger (2)/Korochan Pack Kaizoku Sentai Gokaiger (2) - June 22, 2011
Mini Album Kaizoku Sentai Gokaiger (3)/Korochan Pack Kaizoku Sentai Gokaiger (3) - June 22, 2011
 - February 22, 2012

Tokumei Sentai Go-Busters
 - February 29, 2012
/ - April 25, 2012
/ - June 27, 2012
/ - August 22, 2012
 - December 26, 2012
 - February 13, 2013

References

External links
 (powered by Columbia Music Entertainment)
Engine Sentai Go-onger at Columbia Music Entertainment
Samurai Sentai Shinkenger at Columbia Music Entertainment
Tensou Sentai Goseiger at Columbia Music Entertainment
Kaizoku Sentai Gokaiger at Columbia Music Entertainment
Tokumei Sentai Go-Busters at Columbia Music Entertainment
高橋秀幸 around the world - Hideyuki Takahashi's personal blog

Japanese pop music groups
Nippon Columbia artists
Toei Company